The 2002–03 Eintracht Frankfurt season was the 103rd season in the club's football history. In 2002–03 the club played in the 2. Bundesliga, the second tier of German football. It was the club's 4th season in the 2. Bundesliga. The season ended for Eintracht with promotion to the Bundesliga after finishing 3rd in the 2. Bundesliga.

Results

Friendlies

Indoor soccer tournaments

Nürnberg

Bielefeld

Competitions

2. Bundesliga

League table

Results summary

Matches

DFB-Pokal

Players

First-team squad
Squad at end of season

Left club during season

Eintracht Frankfurt II

Under-19s

Under-17s

Statistics

Appearances and goals 

|}

Transfers

Summer

In:

Out:

Winter

In:

Out:

Notes

References

Sources

External links
 Official English Eintracht website 
 German archive site
 2002–03 Bundesliga season at Fussballdaten.de 

2002-03
German football clubs 2002–03 season